Shadni is a rural locality (a selo) in Tsizgarinsky Selsoviet, Dakhadayevsky District, Republic of Dagestan, Russia. The population was 300 as of 2010. There are 2 streets.

Geography 
Shadni is located 9 km northeast of Urkarakh (the district's administrative centre) by road. Urkarakh and Meusisha are the nearest rural localities.

Nationalities 
Laks live there.

References 

Rural localities in Dakhadayevsky District